Vatnahalsen Station is a railway station on the Flåm Line in Aurland, Norway. The station opened on 1 August 1940.

References

Bibliography

Railway stations on the Flåm Line
Railway stations in Aurland
Railway stations opened in 1941
1941 establishments in Norway